Finn Wiberg (born 7 May 1943) is a Danish former football player and manager.

References
 Danish national team profile
 Stats
 AS Nancy profile

1943 births
Living people
Danish men's footballers
Denmark international footballers
Danish expatriate men's footballers
Expatriate footballers in France
Akademisk Boldklub players
AS Nancy Lorraine players
Ligue 1 players
Association football forwards
Hillerød Fodbold players
Hillerød Fodbold managers
Danish football managers